The Chicago Curling Club is located in Northbrook, Illinois, about 15 miles north of Chicago.  It offers curling for men and women from October through April annually.  The club was founded in 1948. Annual tournaments include the Open Bonspiel (October), Senior Men's Bonspiel (December), the Men's Bonspiel (January) and the Women's Bonspiel - Gloamin' Gaels (January).  In odd numbered years the club hosts a mixed bonspiel in February.

The club hosted the 2010 United States Curling Association Mixed National Championship.

A small room in the club's building houses the American Curling History Museum.

References

External links 

Official website
Midwest Curling Association

Curling clubs established in 1948
Curling clubs in the United States
1948 establishments in Illinois
Northbrook, Illinois
Sports in Cook County, Illinois
Curling in Illinois